Davydovo is a rural locality (a village) in Orekhovo-Zuyevsky District of Moscow Oblast, Russia, located  southeast of Moscow and  south of Orekhovo-Zuyevo. Municipally, the village is the administrative center of Davydovskoye Rural Settlement. Population:   Postal code: 142641.

Davydovo was first mentioned in 1631.

The village of Davydovo is located in the historical area of Zakhod, which is considered by the majority of historians as a part of a larger Guslitsa area. The overwhelming majority of the population of village were Old Believers. An Old Believers' (Russian Orthodox Old-Rite Church) Feast of the Cross church is located in Davydovo.

The most prominent industrial facility in Davydovo is a Michelin tire factory.

References

External links

Orekhovo-Zuyevo portal. Information about Davydovo 

Rural localities in Moscow Oblast
Old Believer communities in Russia
Zakhod